Marquis Trinnell Smith (born January 13, 1975, in San Diego, California) is a former American football safety and linebacker of the National Football League. He was originally drafted by the Cleveland Browns in the third round of the 1999 NFL Draft. He played college football at California

Personal life

Smith now resides in Los Angeles, CA - where he shares a son with his former partner Karla Bell. Smith and Bell were never legally married, but had a small ceremony with family and friends. They later separated due to infidelity. Although separated, the two continue to live together in their home in Los Angeles. Bell remains adamant that the two are still married - although Smith has vehemently denied a romantic relationship with her and does not claim her publicly. This unconventional living situation caused tension in Smith's relationships after Bell - specifically one with a woman he was with after Bell for 5 1/2 years. That relationship would go onto end due to infidelity as well - a common theme with all of Smith's romantic relationships.

References

1975 births
Living people
Players of American football from San Diego
American football safeties
American football linebackers
California Golden Bears football players
Cleveland Browns players
Carolina Panthers players
Oakland Raiders players
Hamburg Sea Devils players